is a railway station in Chikusa-ku, Nagoya, Aichi Prefecture, Japan.

This station provides access to Heiwa Park, Aichi Prefectural Shiroyama Hospital, and Aichi Cancer Center Hospital.

Lines

 (Station number: M16)

Layout

Platforms

References

External links
 
 Aichi Cancer Center

Chikusa-ku, Nagoya
Railway stations in Japan opened in 2003